Fogn Church is a parish church of the Church of Norway in the large Stavanger Municipality in Rogaland county, Norway. It is located on the northwestern side of the island of Fogn. It is one of the two churches for the Talgje parish which is part of the Tungenes prosti (deanery) in the Diocese of Stavanger. The red, wooden church was built in a cruciform design in 1991 using designs by the architect Elisabet Breen Fidjestøl. The church seats about 190 people.

History
The first church on Fogn was a small chapel built in 1916. In 1991, a new church was constructed to replace the little chapel. The new church was consecrated on 17 November 1991.

See also
List of churches in Rogaland

References

Churches in Stavanger
Wooden churches in Norway
Cruciform churches in Norway
20th-century Church of Norway church buildings
Churches completed in 1991
1916 establishments in Norway